Joseph Kohl was Mayor of Neutral Moresnet, a small neutral territory, from 1 July 1859 until 7 February 1882.

References

Mayors of Moresnet
1831 births
1917 deaths
Neutral Moresnet